Vyacheslav Vyacheslavovich Protsenko (born 26 October 1974) is a Russian professional football coach and a former player.  He also holds Ukrainian citizenship.

Club career
He made his debut in the Russian Premier League in 1993 for FC Zhemchuzhina Sochi.

External links
 

1974 births
Living people
Russian footballers
Russia under-21 international footballers
FC Olympik Kharkiv players
FC Zhemchuzhina Sochi players
FC Yenisey Krasnoyarsk players
FC Dynamo Kirov players
Russian Premier League players
Association football midfielders